Suvo may refer to:

 Suvo, Republic of Buryatia, Russia
 Suvo Rudište, Serbia
 Suvo Selo, Serbia